Regions of Light and Sound of God is the debut solo album by My Morning Jacket frontman Jim James, first released on February 5, 2013.

Title
The name of the album comes from Lynd Ward's 1929 wordless novel , which was given to James while he was considering recording a solo album.

Reception
Regions of Light and Sound of God debuted at No. 34 on the Billboard 200, and No. 10 on the Top Rock Albums, selling 17,000 copies in the first week.  The album has sold 56,000 copies in the United States as of November 2016.

Track listing

Personnel
 Jim James - Composer, Producer, Engineering, Vocals, Guitar, Keyboards, Bass, Drums, Various Instruments
 Jenice Heo - Art Direction
 Gary Burden - Art Direction
 Carl Broemel - Cover Photo
 David Givan - Drums on tracks 1, 2, 4, 6, 8, 9
 Emily Hagihara - Percussion
 Rick Kwan - Mixing
 Bob Ludwig - Mastering
 Tucker Martine - Engineer
 Adriana Molello - Strings
 Scott Moore -  Strings
 Kevin Ratterman - Mixing assistant
 Ben Sollee - Strings
 Knaht Voy Yilom - Photography
 "Of the Mother Again" contains a sample of "Fat Dog" by Dr. Dog

Charts

References

2013 albums
ATO Records albums
Jim James albums